Humboldt is a national park in Queensland, Australia, approximately 110 km southeast of Emerald.

The park protects a wetland in the Comet River water catchment in the Brigalow Belt bioregion. Humboldt is a habitat for 148 species of animals and 278 species of plants.

See also

 Protected areas of Queensland

References

National parks of Central Queensland
Protected areas established in 2009